Anthony Barkhovtsev, better known by his in-game name Hard, is a Canadian professional League of Legends player. Hard previously played for Echo Fox in the North American League of Legends Championship Series, Cloud9 Tempest in the North American League of Legends Challenger Series, and Golden Guardians Academy in the LCS Academy League.

Career 
Cloud9 owner Jack Entienne alleged that LA Renegades owner Chris Badawi attempted to poach Hard while he was still under contract with C9, a claim denied by Renegades management.

Hard was announced as part of Echo Fox's starting roster on January 5, 2016. Along with two other foreign players on his team, Froggen and kfo, he missed the first game of the 2016 Spring NA LCS because his team was unable to obtain proper documentation in time.

Echo Fox finished last in the 2016 Summer NA LCS, but survived their relegation match.

Tournament results

Cloud9 Tempest 
 4th — 2015 NA CS Summer Playoffs

Echo Fox 
 7th — 2016 Spring NA LCS
 10th — 2016 Summer NA LCS

References 

League of Legends jungle players
Cloud9 (esports) players
COGnitive Gaming players
Echo Fox players
Golden Guardians players
Team Liquid players
Canadian expatriates in the United States
Living people
Year of birth missing (living people)
Place of birth missing (living people)
Canadian esports players